Local elections were held in Sweden on 9 September 2018 to elect the 20 county councils and 290 municipal councils. Advance voting was allowed between 22 August and 9 September 2018. The elections took place alongside the general elections.

Newly registered parties participated in the 2018 elections, such as the Citizens' Coalition. Many smaller and local parties which had already been established participated, such as the Swedish Senior Citizen Interest Party, Feminist Initiative, the Öland Party, the Laholm Party and more.

Regional councils
Sweden held 20 elections for the Regional Councils. This was the first election where all counties' administrative title had been or were officially being shifted into regions.

Elected

Elections
 2018 Blekinge regional election
 2018 Dalarna regional election
 2018 Gävleborg regional election
 2018 Halland regional election
 2018 Jämtland regional election
 2018 Jönköping regional election
 2018 Kalmar regional election
 2018 Kronoberg regional election
 2018 Norrbotten regional election
 2018 Skåne regional election
 2018 Stockholm regional election
 2018 Södermanland regional election
 2018 Uppsala regional election
 2018 Värmland regional election
 2018 Västerbotten regional election
 2018 Västernorrland regional election
 2018 Västmanland regional election
 2018 Västra Götaland regional election
 2018 Örebro regional election
 2018 Östergötland regional election

Gotland County is made up of one municipal council responsible for both local and regional matters and does not count towards the regional elections.

Municipal councils
The total number of seats nationwide totalled to 12,700, down from 12,780 in the 2014 elections. Turnout was 84.1%.

Further reading 
 Linda Berg & Henrik Oscarsson (2020) The Swedish regional elections 2018, Regional & Federal Studies

References 

Regional elections - Votes Swedish Election Authority
Municipal elections - Votes Swedish Election Authority

County and regional elections in Sweden
Local and municipal elections in Sweden
2018 elections in Sweden